1345 Avenue of the Americas, also known as the  Building, is a -tall, 50-story skyscraper in Midtown Manhattan, New York City. Located on Sixth Avenue between 54th and 55th Streets, the building was built by Fisher Brothers and designed by Emery Roth & Sons. When completed in 1969, the building was originally known as Burlington House, after Burlington Industries. 

1345 Avenue of the Americas is an unrelieved slab structure in the International Style, sometimes referred to as "corporate" style, faced with dark glass. Its small plaza is dominated by its sprinkling fountain like a dandelion seedhead. It replaced the original Ziegfeld Theatre.

First public cellphone call 
A base station atop the building was used on April 3, 1973, by Martin Cooper to make the world's first handheld cellular phone call in public. Cooper, a Motorola inventor, called rival Joel S. Engel of Bell Labs to tell him about the invention.  Engel was staying across the street in the Hilton New York.

In popular culture
In the film Spider-Man 3 (2007), 1345 Avenue of the Americas is the building Gwen Stacy falls from in the crane scene. It also serves as the foyer for the fictional law firm in the film Michael Clayton (2007). It is used as the establishing shot for the corporate headquarters of the fictional company, Dunder Mifflin in the television show The Office.

Tenants
AllianceBernstein
American Institute of Certified Public Accountants
BBVA
First Eagle Funds
Fortress Investment Group
CityMD

See also
List of tallest buildings in New York City

Gallery

References

External links

Emporis
Skyscraperpage

Skyscraper office buildings in Manhattan
Office buildings completed in 1969
Emery Roth buildings
Midtown Manhattan
Sixth Avenue